Isabela's 5th congressional district is one of the six congressional districts of the Philippines in the province of Isabela. It has been represented in the House of Representatives of the Philippines since 2019. The district consists of the municipalities of Aurora, Burgos, Luna, Mallig, Quezon, Quirino, Roxas, and San Manuel. It is currently represented in the 18th Congress by Faustino Michael Carlos T. Dy III of the Partido Federal ng Pilipinas (PFP), who has represented the district since its creation.

Representation history

See also 

 Legislative districts of Isabela

References 

Congressional districts of the Philippines
Politics of Isabela (province)
2018 establishments in the Philippines
Congressional districts of Cagayan Valley
Constituencies established in 2018